Edutainment TV, also abbreviated EduTV, is a television broadcaster in Mongolia.

See also
Media of Mongolia
Communications in Mongolia

References

External links
Official Site 

Television companies of Mongolia